The Men's C1 200 meters competition at the 2013 Summer Universiade in Kazan took place the Kazan Rowing Centre.

Results

Heats

Heat 1

Heat 2

Semifinal

Final

References 

Men's C1 200 meters